Opposite of H2O is the debut studio album by American rapper Drag-On. It was released on March 28, 2000, through Interscope Records and Ruff Ryders. It was produced by Swizz Beatz, Dj Iroc, and P.K., among others. The album proved to be a huge success for Drag-On, peaking at number 5 on the Billboard 200 and number 2 on the Top R&B/Hip-Hop Albums. The album was ultimately certified Gold by the RIAA.

Critical reception 
Rolling Stone wrote that "on the darker songs, [Drag-On's] monotone rides stealthily over the album's dismal grooves, casting a morbid spell, and, ironically, when he and DMX actually collaborate, on the invigorating 'Get It Right', Drag more than holds his own."

Track listing 
Credits adapted from the album's liner notes.

Charts

Weekly charts

Year-end charts

Certifications

References 

2000 debut albums
Drag-On albums
Albums produced by Swizz Beatz
Interscope Records albums
Ruff Ryders Entertainment albums